Hamad International Airport  is an international airport in the State of Qatar, and the home of Qatar’s flag carrier airline, Qatar Airways. Located east of its capital, Doha, it replaced the nearby Doha International Airport as Qatar's principal and main national airport. 

Formerly known as New Doha International Airport (NDIA), Hamad International Airport was originally scheduled to open in 2008, but after a series of costly delays, the airport finally opened six years overdue on 30 April 2014 with a ceremonial Qatar Airways flight landing from nearby Doha International. Qatar Airways and all other carriers formally relocated to the new airport on 27 May 2014. The airport is named after the previous Emir of Qatar, Hamad bin Khalifa Al Thani.

History

Planning and construction
The planning started in 2003 while the construction began in 2005.

Hamad International Airport was designed to cater for a projected ongoing increase in the volume of traffic. The airport has an initial annual capacity of 29 million passengers, three times the current volume. Upon completion, it will be able to handle 50 million passengers per year, although some estimates suggest the airport could handle up to 93 million per year, making it the second largest airport in the region after Dubai. It is also expected to handle 320,000 aircraft movements and 2 million tonnes of cargo annually. The check-in and retail areas are expected to be 12 times larger than those at the current airport. The airport will be two-thirds the size of Doha city. The airport has an oasis theme. Many of the buildings have a water motif, with wave-styled roofs and desert plants growing in recycled water.

The Steering Committee awarded the contract for the development of the airport to Bechtel. The contract includes the design, construction management and project management of the facilities. The terminal and concourses were designed by the architecture firm HOK. Engineering, Procurement and Construction contract for Phase I and II were undertaken by Turkish TAV Construction and Japanese Taisei Corporation.

Opening
Cargo operations began from 1 December 2013, with an inaugural flight by Qatar Airways Cargo arriving from Europe. The original soft launch on 2 April 2013 was cancelled just a few hours prior, and was postponed indefinitely due to unsatisfactory safety related issues that needed further reviewing taking nine months to address. Hamad International Airport was then set to begin passenger operations in January 2014, with a soft opening.

Qatar Airways threatened a $600 million lawsuit against the joint venture contractor Lindner Depa Interiors for delaying the opening of the airport by failing to complete its lounges on time; LDI stated that it was delayed due to inadequate site access. Qatar Airways later blamed Bechtel for the opening delay in April 2013, citing failures to meet regulatory requirements.

Operations
Hamad International Airport finally began passenger operations on 30 April 2014, with ten initial airlines operating. Qatar Airways and remaining airlines started operations to Hamad Airport on 27 May 2014 at 09:00 (Qatar time).

An expansion plan announced in September 2015 called for an extension of the check-in area, an expansion of concourses D and E into a 1.3 km long concourse, a new passenger amenity area in the D/E complex with lounges, shops and restaurants.  As part of this expansion plan, the Doha Metro was extended to the airport with the opening of the red line airport branch in December 2019.

In 2016, the airport was named the 50th busiest airport in the world by passenger traffic, serving 37,283,987 passengers, a 20.2% increase from 2015.

In 2019, the airport witnessed a 12.4% increase in annual passenger traffic. More than 38.8 million passengers arrived at the airport in 2019, up from 34.5 million in 2018.

Controversies
On 2 October 2020 a newborn female baby was found abandoned in a bin. In response to this the authorities ordered females of childbearing age from 10 different planes to disembark and undergo a forced vaginal examination. The Qatari Prime Minister issued an apology and ordered an investigation.
The Australian government "registered its strong disapproval and outrage" at the treatment of Australian women who were subjected to compulsory intimate medical examinations at Doha airport. On 30 October 2020, a report by The Guardian stated the apology of Qatari government saying “sincerest apology for what some female travelers went through as a result of the measures” adding “While the aim of the urgently decided search was to prevent the perpetrators of the horrible crime from escaping, the state of Qatar regrets any distress or infringement on the personal freedoms of any traveler caused by this action.” Shortly thereafter the Qatari government cancelled a subsidy for the Australian lamb industry. As of the beginning of 2021 none of the women who were searched have been contacted by the Qatari authorities.

Facilities

Terminal 1

 Concourse A has 10 passenger gates connected to jet bridges and is located west of the check-in area and Main Terminal. Two of the gates are designed to accommodate the Airbus A380.
 Concourse B has 10 passenger gates connected to jet bridges and is located east of the check-in area. It has opened on April 30, 2014 with 10 airlines transferring operations over from Doha International Airport. Two of the gates are built to accommodate the Airbus A380. There is a small coffee shop located at the end of Concourse B, as well as smoking rooms, family areas, and an express duty-free store.
 Concourse C has 13 passenger gates connected to jet bridges, two of them built specifically for the Airbus A380. There are 10 remote gates without a fixed jet bridge link connected to Concourse C. This Concourse has opened on 27 May 2014.
 Concourse D is fully operational. Gates 1–4 are on the first floor and Gates 18–24 are on the ground floor. (Gates 2 and 4 will be permanently closed due to the expansion of HIA)
 Concourse E is fully operational. Gates 1–4 are on the first floor and Gates 18–24 are on the ground floor. (Gates 2 and 4 will be permanently closed due to the expansion of HIA)

Concourses D and E are due to be extended with a possible Concourse F although plans are still to be finalised. Terminal 1 features First (called Al Safwa First Class Lounge) and Business Class (called Al Mourjan Business Class Lounge) lounges which were opened by Qatar Airways CEO, Akbar Al Baker on 20 June 2014. Since 2016, a cable-drawn Cable Liner has connected Halls A and B over a distance of around 500m Indoors with Halls D and E, with availability 24 hours a day.

Lamp Bear
The most prominent figure inside the airport is a giant bronze statue of a teddy bear with its head in a lamp. The untitled sculpture, often known as "Lamp Bear", is one of three creations by Swiss artist Urs Fischer and is on display at the grand foyer of the airport's duty-free shopping hall. Standing at seven meters tall and weighing approximately 18-20 tons, the statue was previously displayed at the Seagram Building's plaza in New York City before being purchased by a member of the Qatari royal family at a Christie's auction for US$6.8 million.

In 2018 the airport added a new sculpture in their terminal, called Small Lie by American artist Kaws which was a donation from Qatar Museums.

Expansion 
There were plans to expand the terminal in order to accommodate the increased passengers numbers of the FIFA 2022 World Cup, and to keep up with Qatar Airway's continued passenger growth. The airport handled 34.5 million passengers in 2018 and this is expected to rise to 53 million by 2020. The project will also add  of retail and F&B space, and an expanded transfer area. A new Qatar Airways Al Mourjan Business Class Lounge will occupy the mezzanine level, and covering  it will be the world's largest airport lounge. In addition concourses D & E will be lengthened to accommodate nine additional wide-body aircraft stands.

Runways

Airlines and destinations

Passenger
The following airlines operate regular scheduled and charter flights to and from Doha:

  Biman Bangladesh Airlines' flight from Doha to Dhaka makes a stop at Sylhet. However, the flight from Dhaka to Doha is non-stop.

Cargo

Statistics

See also
 Transport in Qatar
 List of airports in Qatar

References

External links

Airports in Qatar
2013 establishments in Qatar
Airports established in 2013